Marquesas swamphen (Porphyrio paepae) is a presumably extinct species of swamphen from the Marquesas Islands Hiva Oa and Tahuata. It was originally described from 600-year-old subfossil remains from Tahuata and Hiva Oa. It may have survived to around 1900; in the lower right corner of Paul Gauguin's 1902 painting Le Sorcier d'Hiva Oa ou le Marquisien à la cape rouge there is a bird which resembles native descriptions of Porphyrio paepae. Thor Heyerdahl claimed to have seen a similar flightless bird on Hiva Oa in 1937.

Notes

References

Marquesas swamphen
Birds of the Marquesas Islands
Extinct birds of Oceania
Holocene extinctions
Late Quaternary prehistoric birds
Marquesas swamphen